Ahmed Sadiqur Rahman is a First-class and List A cricketer from Bangladesh. He was born on 20 December 1987 in Sylhet and is a right-handed batsman and off break bowler. He is sometimes referred to on scoresheets by his nickname Tajim and appeared for Sylhet Division between 2003/04 and 2006/07. His best first-class bowling, 4 for 47, came against Rajshahi Division while he scored 2 first-class fifties, the best a knock of 59 against Chittagong Division. He proved more prolific in the one day arena, scoring 80 against Khulna Division and taking 4 for 70 against the same opposition.

References

1987 births
Bangladeshi cricketers
Sylhet Division cricketers
Living people
Brothers Union cricketers
Bangladesh East Zone cricketers
Khelaghar Samaj Kallyan Samity cricketers